Gwen Adshead (born 1960) is a forensic psychotherapist, Visiting Professor of Psychiatry at Gresham College, Jochelson visiting professor at the Yale School of Law and Psychiatry, and consultant forensic psychiatrist at Ravenswood House.
At the age of 11 Adshead flew to England alone to attend Cheltenham Ladies' College as a boarder.
Adshead qualified in medicine in 1983 and holds two master's degrees; in medical law and ethics, and in mindfulness based cognitive therapy. She was elected a Fellow of the Royal College of Psychiatrists in 2005. She was previously a consultant at Broadmoor Hospital, where she treated people referred to by the media as "the violent insane", but whom she described as "not mad or bad, but sad". She has written more than a hundred academic papers.

In 2012 received a Jerwood Award to support the writing of A Short Book About Evil, published 28 Apr 2015.

Personal Life 
She is the mother of two boys. She is a Christian and enjoys singing as part of a choir.

Media Appearances 
She was the castaway on the BBC Radio programme Desert Island Discs on 1 July 2010. 

In August 2022 she was on BBC HARDtalk where she discussed her career, compassion and the concept of evil.

Bibliography 
  (28 Apr 2015)

References 

1960 births
Living people
British psychiatrists
British psychotherapists
Fellows of the Royal College of Psychiatrists
Professors of Gresham College
British women psychiatrists